Jasper Adrian Garnett (1889 – 23 October 1951) was a Fijian farmer. He served as a member of the Legislative Council between 1944 and 1947.

Born in Fiji in 1889, he became a farmer in Tailevu. He chaired the Rewa Co-operative Dairy and was a freemason. In 1944 he was nominated by the Governor to become a member of the Legislative Council, serving until 1947. He died in Suva in October 1951 at the age of 62.

Garnett was married and had three children.

References

1889 births
Fijian farmers
Members of the Legislative Council of Fiji
1951 deaths